Syed Sagar is an Indian cricketer who generally plays for Jammu and Kashmir. He is a right-handed batsman. He holds the record for the highest T20 individual score when batting at number 9 or lower (74).

References 

Indian cricketers
1990 births
Living people
Jammu and Kashmir cricketers
People from Srinagar